Like It Is may refer to:

 Like It Is (film)
 Like It Is (TV series)
 "Like It Is" (song), a 2020 single by Kygo, Zara Larsson and Tyga
 Like It Is, a 2017 album by the band Tigress

See also 
 Like It Is, Was, and Evermore Shall Be, a compilation album by Donovan
 Like It Is: Yes at the Bristol Hippodrome, a 2014 live album by the band Yes